Psych: 9 is a 2010 American-Czech horror film directed by Andrew Shortell.  It stars Sara Foster and Michael Biehn.

Plot
While dealing with her own mental issues, Roslyn takes the night shift at a recently closed hospital's psych ward.  As she experiences possibly supernatural phenomena, she comes to suspect that her husband, Cole, is a serial killer active in the area.

Cast
 Sara Foster as Roslyn
 Cary Elwes as Dr. Clement
 Michael Biehn as Det. Marling
 Gabriel Mann as Cole
 Colleen Camp as Beth

Production
Shooting took place in Prague.

Release
Psych 9 played in the UK in May 2010 and at Screamfest Horror Film Festival on October 12.  It was released on DVD and Blu-Ray on February 22, 2011.

Reception
Kim Newman of Empire rated it 2/5 stars and called it "predictable fare with a few good performances".  Steve Barton of Dread Central rated it 2/5 stars and wrote, "It's all been done before and done much better.".  Describing the film's use of haunted house and serial killer tropes, R. L. Shaffer of IGN rated it 4/10 stars and called it "more or less a combination of two half-cocked ideas".  In comparing it to a Lifetime made-for-cable film, Peter Brown of Shock Till You Drop criticized the amount of time spent on back story and concluded that the film is too illogical and clichéd.  Annie Riordan of Brutal as Hell called it "stunningly unscary and totally nonsensical".

References

External links
 
 
 

2010 films
2010 horror films
American horror films
Czech horror films
Films shot in the Czech Republic
2010s English-language films
2010s American films